Gasoline is the second studio album released by Theory of a Deadman on March 29, 2005. The album features four songs used in the video game Fahrenheit (also known as Indigo Prophecy), "Santa Monica", "No Surprise", "Say Goodbye" and "No Way Out". The album was first released in Canada by 604 Records, and was later released in the U.S. by Roadrunner Records. The original 604 Records release of the album is fully unedited, however the Roadrunner version released in the U.S. contains edited versions of "No Surprise" and "Me & My Girl", making this the band's only album not to carry a "Parental Advisory" sticker. The album was released to mixed reviews from critics.

Composition
The album has a much more mellow sound than the last, which was more alternative metal based with this album being closer to an acoustic and alternative rock sound.

Track listing

Special edition bonus tracks

Personnel
Tyler Connolly - lead vocals, lead guitar
Dave Brenner - rhythm guitar, backing vocals
Dean Back - bass, backing vocals
Brent Fitz - drums, backing vocals
with
Daniel Adair - drums on "Santa Monica"

Production
Based on AllMusic

Howard Benson - producer
 Mike Plotnikoff - recording
 Hatsikazu "Hatch" Inagaki - engineer
Chris Lord-Alge - mixing
Ted Jensen - mastering at Sterling Sound in NYC, NY

Chart positions

Singles

References

Theory of a Deadman albums
2005 albums
Roadrunner Records albums